Prince Regent DLR station is a station on the Docklands Light Railway (DLR) in Canning Town in east London. The station was opened on 28 March 1994 and provides access to the eastern end of the ExCeL Exhibition Centre and ICC London. The station signage is subtitled 'for ExCeL East'.

The station is named after Prince Regent Lane, which runs north from the station towards the A13 road.

There is a small bus station adjoining the station with buses to Plaistow and London City Airport.

The station is located on the DLR's Beckton branch, between Custom House and Royal Albert stations. It is in Travelcard Zone 3. 
During major exhibitions at the adjacent Excel Centre an additional DLR shuttle service operates between Canning Town and Prince Regent stations, to supplement the normal Tower Gateway to Beckton service. The trains shuttle reverse on a crossover well to the east of the station, within sight of the next station at Royal Albert.

Connections
The London buses that serve Prince regent DLR station is 147, 241, 300, 304, 325, 473, 678 (school journeys only) and N551 (night journeys only).

References

External links 

 Docklands Light Railway website – Prince Regent station page

Docklands Light Railway stations in the London Borough of Newham
Railway stations in Great Britain opened in 1994
Station